Elections were held in the organized municipalities in the Parry Sound District of Ontario on October 25, 2010 in conjunction with municipal elections across the province.

The Archipelago
The Archipelago was one of a number of municipalities in the region whose mayors won by acclamation.

Armour
Armour was one of a number of municipalities in the region whose mayors won by acclamation. Rod Blakelock, Marty Corcoran, Jerry Brandt and Patrick Hayes were elected to council.

Burk's Falls
Burk's Falls was one of a number of municipalities in the region whose mayors won by acclamation. Bruce Campbell, Rex Smith, Lisa Morrison and Lewis Hodgson will serve on council.

Callander
Callander's entire council was acclaimed into office. Doug Brydges, Virginia Onley, Robb Noon and Maurice Turgeon will serve on council.

Carling
Carling was one of a number of municipalities in the region whose mayors won by acclamation. Mike Konoval, Susan Murphy, Sid Larson and Michael Gordon were elected to council.

Joly
Joly was one of a number of municipalities in the region whose mayors won by acclamation. Betty Barnes, Tom Rheubottom, Bruce Baker and Marion Duke were elected to council.

Kearney
Paul Tomlinson won the mayoral race in Kearney, a victory which local media credited to unusually high turnout among seasonal cottage country residents after the town attempted to eliminate its mail-in voting process. Louise Wadsworth, Arthur Murdy, Ken Ball, Steve Sainsbury, Barry Dingwall and Yvonne Wills were elected as councillors.

Machar

Doug Maeck won the mayoralty of Machar. Ron McLaren, Ronald Bennison, Lynn Mantha and Bill Russell were elected to council.

Magnetawan

Former mayor Sam Dunnett defeated incumbent mayor Dick Smith in Magnetawan. Charlie Gray, Jack Crossman, Barry Mutton and Bryan Hampson were elected to council.

McDougall
McDougall was one of a number of municipalities in the region whose mayors won by acclamation. Kim Dixon, Lewis Malott, Peter Daleman and Joe Johnson were elected to council.

McKellar
Peter Hopkins was elected reeve of McKellar, defeating incumbent David Moore and challenger Debbie Zulak. Tamara Black, Ted Stroud, Jury Naklowych and Gerald Bell were elected to council.

McMurrich/Monteith
McMurrich/Monteith was one of a number of municipalities in the region whose mayors won by acclamation. Tina Scott, Merv Mulligan, Lynn Zemnicky and Carol Armstrong were elected to council.

Nipissing
Pat Haufe won the mayoralty of Nipissing. Tom Piper, Liz Smith, Thomas H. Butler and Dougal Culham were elected to council.

Parry Sound
Councillor Jamie McGarvey won the mayoral election in Parry Sound over challenger Perry Harris. Paul Borneman, Bonnie Keith, Brad Horne, Keith Saulnier, Dave Williams and Dan McCauley were elected to council.

Perry
Perry was one of a number of municipalities in the region whose mayors won by acclamation. Mary Anne Love, Jim Cushman, Les Rowley and Norm Hofstetter were elected to council.

Powassan
Peter McIsaac won 67 per cent of the mayoral vote in Powassan, defeating incumbent mayor Bob Young. Todd White, Gerry Giesler, Nancy Barner, Dave Britton, Roger Glabb and Steven Eide were elected to council.

Ryerson
Incumbent reeve Glenn Miller was re-elected in Ryerson. Council will consist of Barbara Marlow, George Sterling, Rosalind Hall and Doug Weddell.

Seguin

Incumbent mayor David Conn was re-elected in Seguin. Alex Chidley, Bruce Gibbon, Rod Osborne, Doug Sainsbury, Everett Jacklin and Jack Hepworth were elected to council.

South River
Incumbent mayor Jim Coleman was reelected in South River. Bill O'Hallarn, Sharon Smith, Les Mahon and Jeff Dickerson were elected to council.

Strong
Christine Ellis defeated incumbent mayor Stephen Rawn to become the first female mayor of Strong. Jason Cottrell, Kelly Elik, John Newstead and Merlyn Snow were elected to council.

Sundridge
Incumbent mayor Elgin Schneider was re-elected in Sundridge. Bill de Vries, Christopher Blueman, Lawrie Vincer and Barry Morris were elected to council.

Whitestone
Incumbent mayor Chris Armstrong was re-elected in Whitestone. Don Carter, Bill Church, Colette Deacon and Joe Lamb were elected to council.

References

2010 Ontario municipal elections
Parry Sound District